Mastrils is a former municipality in the district of Landquart in the Swiss canton of Graubünden.  The municipalities of Igis and Mastrils merged on 1 January 2012 into the new municipality of Landquart.

History
Mastrils is first mentioned in 1318 as Ponstrils.  In 1345 it was mentioned as Bastrils.  In 1854 the municipality separated from Zizers to become an independent municipality.

Geography

Of this area, 23.9% is used for agricultural purposes, while 68.8% is forested. Of the rest of the land, 2.5% is settled (buildings or roads) and the remainder (4.9%) is non-productive (rivers, glaciers or mountains).

The municipality is located in the Fünf Dörfer sub-district of the Landquart district.  It is a widely scattered settlement on in the foothills of the Calanda mountains.  It consists of the settlements of Isla, Tardisbrücke and Trätsch.

Demographics
, 8.5% of the population was made up of foreign nationals. Over the last 10 years the population has grown at a rate of 1.1%. Most of the population speaks German (93.0%), with Italian being second most common ( 1.9%) and Romansh being third ( 1.5%).

, the gender distribution of the population was 49.4% male and 50.6% female.  The age distribution, in Mastrils is; 54 children or 10.2% of the population are between 0 and 9 years old.  31 teenagers or 5.9% are 10 to 14, and 48 teenagers or 9.1% are 15 to 19.  Of the adult population, 53 people or 10.0% of the population are between 20 and 29 years old.  88 people or 16.6% are 30 to 39, 86 people or 16.3% are 40 to 49, and 82 people or 15.5% are 50 to 59.  The senior population distribution is 38 people or 7.2% of the population are between 60 and 69 years old, 38 people or 7.2% are 70 to 79, there are 10 people or 1.9% who are 80 to 89, and there are 1 people or 0.2% who are 90 to 99.

In the 2007 federal election the most popular party was the SVP which received 35.8% of the vote.  The next three most popular parties were the SP (29%), the CVP (14.8%) and the FDP (14.4%).

The entire Swiss population is generally well educated.  In Mastrils about 71.8% of the population (between age 25-64) have completed either non-mandatory upper secondary education or additional higher education (either university or a Fachhochschule).

Mastrils has an unemployment rate of 1.08%.  , there were 36 people employed in the primary economic sector and about 16 businesses involved in this sector.  14 people are employed in the secondary sector and there are 5 businesses in this sector.  44 people are employed in the tertiary sector, with 12 businesses in this sector.

The historical population is given in the following table:

References

External links
Official Web site

Landquart, Switzerland
Former municipalities of Graubünden